Sing My Song (season 1) was broadcast on CCTV-3 from January 3, 2014 to March 21, 2014, presented by Negmat Rahman. Yang Kun, Tanya Chua, Liu Huan and Wakin Chau were the four judges of this season. The winner was Henry Huo (霍尊) of Liu Huan team and Mosi Zishi (莫西子诗) of Yang Kun team was the runner-up.

The Recordings 
The blind audition stage in Sing My Song is called "The Recordings". In front of each producer, there is a lyric screen and a red control bar. If a producer pushes the bar, it means he/she is recording the song and want the song in his/her original album. The lyrics screen will then move down, allowing the producer to see the contestant on stage. This part bears resemblance to the blind auditions in The Voice.

Episode 1 (January 3) 
Episode 1 on CCTV's official YouTube channel

Episode 2 (January 10) 
Episode 2 on CCTV's official YouTube channel

Episode 3 (January 17) 
Episode 3 on CCTV's official YouTube channel

Episode 4 (January 21) 
Episode 4 on CCTV's official YouTube channel

Episode 5 (January 28) 
Episode 5 on CCTV's official YouTube channel

Episode 6 (February 7) 
Episode 6 on CCTV's official YouTube channel

The Singles
The battle stage in Sing My Song is called "The Singles". After the audition rounds, each tutor has chosen 16 songs, and now they must have again selected 8 of 16 songs to play in this battle round. On each day, the 51 media juries have given a score by live votes (1 vote = 1 point) for each song after each contestant performance. After 8 performances of that day, the 3 others team tutors, each could give 5 points for only one contestant they wanted. The first song that won the highest score and the second song was selected by their team tutor would become two main songs of their tutor album, and that two contestants have represented their team to perform on the final stage.

Episode 7 (February 21) - Liu Huan team - "Nine New Beat" (新九拍)
Episode 7 on CCTV's official YouTube channel

 + "卷珠帘" of Henry Huo have the same final score with "鸟人" of Wula Dou'en but he won the second place by the choice of Liu Huan, their team tutor.

Episode 8 (February 28) - Wakin Chau team - "New Wild Energy" (江湖新能量)
Episode 8 on CCTV's official YouTube channel

Episode 9 (March 7) - Yang Kun team - "Into A New Era" (走进心时代)
Episode 9 on CCTV's official YouTube channel

Episode 10 (March 14) - Tanya Chua team - "Life Taste" (美味人生)
Episode 10 on CCTV's official YouTube channel

Episode 11 (March 21) - The Song
Episode 11 on CCTV's official YouTube channel

The final stage in Sing My Song is called "The Song".

Tutor special performance

Final stage
At the first round, 8 performances divided into 2 turns, 4 each. Each song was performed by contestant with their tutor or their tutor guest. After each turn, the song that won the highest live vote by audience would be advanced to final round.

At the final round, the 2 songs was voted publicly by 101 media juries. The song that won the highest vote would take the title "Best Chinese Song of the Year", that contestant would become the winner and take the final cup of Sing My Song.

Ratings

The data determined by CSM.

References

2014 in Chinese music
2014 Chinese television seasons